{{Infobox election
| election_name = 2001 Norwegian Parliamentary election
| country = Norway
| type = parliamentary
| ongoing = no
| previous_election = 1997 Norwegian parliamentary election
| previous_mps = List of members of Stortinget 2001–2005
| previous_year = 1997
| next_election = 2005 Norwegian parliamentary election
| next_year = 2005
| seats_for_election = All 165 seats to the Norwegian Parliament  83 seats were needed for a majority
| election_date = 9–10 September 2001
| image1 = 
| leader1 = Thorbjørn Jagland
| party1 = Norwegian Labour Party
| last_election1 = 65 seats, 35.00%
| seats1 = 43
| seat_change1 = 22
| popular_vote1 = 612,632
| percentage1 = 24.29%
| swing1 =  10.71 pp

| image2 = 
| leader2 = Jan Petersen
| party2 = Conservative Party of Norway
| last_election2 = 23 seats, 14.34%
| seats2 = 38
| seat_change2 = 15
| popular_vote2 = 534,852
| percentage2 = 21.21%
| swing2 =  6.87 pp

| image3 = Carl i Hagen043 2E jpg DF0000062790.jpg
| leader3 = Carl I. Hagen
| party3 = Progress Party (Norway)
| last_election3 = 25 seats, 15.30%
| seats3 = 26
| seat_change3 = 1
| popular_vote3 = 369,236
| percentage3 = 14.64%
| swing3 =  0.66 pp
| image4 = Kristin_Halvorsen_Sentralbanksjefens_årstale_2018_(191746).jpg
| party4 = Socialist Left Party (Norway)
| last_election4 = 9 seats, 6.01%
| seats4 = 23
| seat_change4 = 14
| popular_vote4 = 316,397
| percentage4 = 12.55%
| swing4 =  6.54 pp
| image5 = Kjell Magne Bondevik, Norges statsminister, under presskonferens vid Nordiska radets session i Stockholm.jpg
| party5 = Christian Democratic Party (Norway)
| last_election5 = 25 seats, 13.66%
| seats5 = 22
| seat_change5 = 3
| popular_vote5 = 312,839
| percentage5 = 12.41%
| swing5 =  1.25 pp
| image6 = 
| party6 = Centre Party (Norway)
| last_election6 = 11 seats, 7.93%
| seats6 = 10
| seat_change6 = 1
| popular_vote6 = 140,287
| percentage6 = 5.56%
| swing6 =  2.37 pp
| image7 = 
| leader7 = Lars Sponheim
| party7 = Liberal Party of Norway
| last_election7 = 6 seats, 4.45%
| seats7 = 2
| seat_change7 = 4
| popular_vote7 = 98,486
| percentage7 = 3.91%
| swing7 =  0.54 pp
| leader8 = Steinar Bastesen
| party8 = Coastal Party
| last_election8 = –
| seats8 = 1
| seat_change8 = new
| popular_vote8 = 44,010
| percentage8 = 1.75%
| swing8 = new
| title = Prime Minister
| posttitle = Prime Minister after election
| before_election = Jens Stoltenberg
| before_party = Norwegian Labour Party
| after_election = Kjell Magne Bondevik
| after_party = Christian Democratic Party (Norway)
| candidate4 = Kristin Halvorsen
| candidate5 = Kjell Magne Bondevik
| candidate6 = Odd Roger Enoksen
}}Parliamentary elections''' were held in Norway on 9 and 10 September 2001. The governing Labour Party lost seats and their vote share was the worst they had ever obtained in a post-war election. Although they still won a plurality of votes and seats, they were unable to form a government. Instead, a centre-right coalition of the Conservative Party, the Christian Democratic Party and Liberal Party was formed, led by Prime Minister Kjell Magne Bondevik of the Christian Democratic Party, with confidence and supply support from the Progress Party.

Opinion polls

Polls are indicated by share of votes in percentage, or by seats indicated by brackets. The Progress Party saw the most surprising changes in support, having achieved as high as 34.7% in September 2000, and in 2001 almost closing down to 10% at the lowest. The Labour Party and Conservative Party also varied greatly in support in the years before the election.

Results

Seat distribution

References

Further reading

External links
Storting Election 2001 - Labour's worst election in 77 years from Statistics Norway
Results by district Psephos

General elections in Norway
2000s elections in Norway
Norway
2001 in Norway
September 2001 events in Europe